Barry Coleman, sometimes written Berry Coleman, was a state legislator in Arkansas. He and J. N. Donohoo represented Phillips County, Arkansas in the Arkansas House of Representatives.

He served in 1874–1875 and 1877 representing Phillips County, Arkansas. He was a Republican.

See also
African-American officeholders during and following the Reconstruction era

References

People from Phillips County, Arkansas
Republican Party members of the Arkansas House of Representatives
African-American state legislators in Arkansas
Year of birth missing
African-American politicians during the Reconstruction Era
Year of death missing